The Well of Stars is a science fiction novel written by Robert Reed. It was published in 2004 and is the sequel to Marrow, published in 2000.

Synopsis 
The Well of Stars features the same universe and the same characters as the earlier novel Marrow. In The Well of Stars, the ship is entering a dark nebula, dubbed the Ink Well, which turns out to be inhabited by an intelligent and hostile entity which calls itself "polyponds". The ship fights for its existence, while at the same time it is suggested that the enemies of the ship's creators are in pursuit.

Translations 
 French: "" Bragelonne, 2007

References

External links 
 Short review in the New York Times Retrieved 2009-10-19
 Short review in Analog Science Fiction Retrieved 2021-04-19

2004 science fiction novels
American science fiction novels
2004 American novels